Mount Vernon Township is one of seventeen rural townships in Black Hawk County, Iowa, USA.  As of the 2000 census, its population was 1098.

Geography
According to the USGS, it contains four cemeteries: East Janesville, Mount Vernon Evangelical, Saint Paul United Church of Christ and Saint Pauls.

References

External links
 US-Counties.com
 City-Data.com

Townships in Black Hawk County, Iowa
Waterloo – Cedar Falls metropolitan area
Townships in Iowa